Robertas Fridrikas (born 8 April 1967) is a Lithuanian former football forward, who last played for WAF Procar in Austria during his professional career.

Fridrikas was nicknamed Garrincha, after the famous Brazilian winger, since his one leg was shorter than the other just like Garrincha's.

International career
He obtained ten caps for the Lithuania national football team, scoring two goals in 1992.

Personal life
Fridrikas' wife, Ausra Fridrikas, was one of the best handballers of the 1990s. His two sons, Mantas and Lukas are also professional footballers. He remained in Austria after retirement, and now works in the tourism industry.

Honours
 Austrian Football Bundesliga winner: 1991–92 1992–93 
 Austrian Cup winner: 1991–92 1993–94

International goals

References

External links
 
 Profile at playerhistory.com

1967 births
Living people
Sportspeople from Kaunas
Soviet footballers
Lithuanian footballers
Lithuanian expatriate footballers
Lithuania international footballers
FK Žalgiris players
FC Guria Lanchkhuti players
FC Lokomotiv Moscow players
FK Austria Wien players
Soviet Top League players
Austrian Football Bundesliga players
Lithuanian expatriate sportspeople in Austria
Expatriate footballers in Austria
Association football wingers